Tavaneh (also Romanized as Tavāneh) is a village in Garin Rural District, Zarrin Dasht District, Nahavand County, Hamadan Province, Iran. At the 2006 census, its population was 2,992, in 746 families.

References 

Populated places in Nahavand County